Comp 175: A Benefit for Queer Programs & Services in the Pacific Northwest is a 45 song, 3 disc charity compilation record produced by Logan Lynn and released on his label, Logan Lynn Music, on November 27, 2012.  Artists featured on "Comp 175" include Logan Lynn, Peaches, Matt Alber, God-Des & She, Magic Mouth, Scream Club, Christeene and dozens of other LGBTQ and allied acts, 36 in all.  100% of all proceeds from this album go to charity.

Charity
On November 27, 2012 Portland musician Logan Lynn Produced and released a compilation record titled "Comp 175: A Benefit for Queer Programs and Services in the Pacific Northwest" which featured 36 bands across 45 songs. The tagline seen in all promotional materials for the album read "Your purchase of this record helps to ensure that the important work of this vital community resource continues." The day the album was released, Logan Lynn, Jeb Havens and Kelly Moe appeared together on a live broadcast of Out Loud Radio, where they were each interviewed about the charity.

Concept
Paragraph 175, also known as "Section 175", was a provision of the German Criminal Code from 1871 to 1994, making homosexuality a crime. Over 140,000 people were convicted under the law. The Nazis broadened the law in 1935 and thousands died in concentration camps in the prosecutions that followed.  According to producer Logan Lynn, "Comp 175" was given its title because "Today, all over the world, the fight for LGBTQ freedom and equality is not yet won."

Featured Artists

 Logan Lynn
 Peaches
 Scream Club
 Matt Alber
 God-Des & She
 Magic Mouth
 Christeene
 Tom Goss
 Bobby Jo Valentine
 Shunda K
 Nicky Click
 Brett Gleason
 Jeremy Gloff
 Deluxe
 Houston Bernard
 Kelly Moe
 Atole
 Mattachine Social
 The Sexbots
 Kimono Kops
 Jeb Havens
 Towering Trees
 Noah Daniel Wood
 Barbi Crash
 Kerry Hallett
 Katrina Skalland
 Blue Redder
 L10
 Microfilm
 Jana Fisher
 A Million Tiny Architects
 Matthew Mercer
 Stephan Nance
 Marshall J. Pierce
 Jonny
 Alternate Destination

Track listings

Disc 1

Disc 2

Disc 3

References

External links
Logan Lynn — official web site.

Logan Lynn albums
2012 albums
Charity albums
Peaches